Illinois City is an unincorporated community in the U.S. state of Illinois, across the Mississippi River from Muscatine, Iowa. It straddles Buffalo Prairie Township and Drury Township in Rock Island County, Illinois.

, a United States Post Office, ZIP Code 61259, remains open at 23828 124th Avenue West.

Demographics

References

Unincorporated communities in Rock Island County, Illinois
Unincorporated communities in Illinois